Pirzəkücə (also, Pirəzküçə) is a village and municipality in the Lerik Rayon of Azerbaijan. It has a population of 356.

References

Populated places in Lerik District